Sontra is a small town in the Werra-Meißner-Kreis in northeastern Hesse, Germany.

The air spa of Sontra is known as Berg- und Hänselstadt, with Bergstadt referring to the time when there was bituminous shale mining (“mining” is Bergbau in German) in town, and Hänselstadt to the town's former membership in the Hanse. In the town, whose area covers 111.29 km², live 8,568 inhabitants.

Geography

Location
Sontra lies between Bad Hersfeld (some 30 km to the southwest), Kassel (some 45 km to the northwest) and Eisenach (some 35 km to the east), east of the Stölzinger Gebirge, north of the Richelsdorfer Gebirge and west of the Ringgau (ranges), and also 16 km southwest of Eschwege. Flowing through town are the river Sontra, which near Wehretal empties into the Wehre, and the river Ulfe, which empties into the Sontra near the outlying centre of Wichmannshausen.

Neighbouring communities
Sontra borders in the north on the town of Waldkappel and the community of Wehretal, in the east on the communities of Ringgau and Herleshausen (all in the Werra-Meißner-Kreis), in the southeast on the community of Gerstungen (in Thuringia’s Wartburgkreis), in the south on the communities of Wildeck and Nentershausen and in the southwest on the community of Cornberg (all three in Hersfeld-Rotenburg).

Constituent communities
Sontra’s 15 Ortsteile, besides the main town, also called Sontra, are Berneburg, Blankenbach, Breitau, Diemerode, Heyerode, Hornel, Krauthausen, Lindenau, Mitterode, Stadthosbach, [Thurnhosbach] :de:Thurnhosbach, Ulfen, Weißenborn, Wichmannshausen and Wölfterode.

History

In 775, Sontra’s outlying centre of Ulfen had its first documentary mention. In the 8th century, Sontra itself was also mentioned for the first time. In 1232, a Kunigunde de Suntraha was named, who on a visit to Saint Elizabeth’s grave in Marburg experienced healing. Town rights were granted Sontra in 1368.

There was bituminous shale mining in Sontra beginning no later than 1499, and it continued right through to the 1950s.

In the centre of Donnershag, which is part of Sontra, the settlement society known as Freiland-Freigeld was resident in the 1920s.

Politics

Town council
The municipal election held on 6 March 2016 yielded the following results: in comparison the elections in 2011:

Executive
The town's executive (Magistrat) is made up of nine councillors, with four seats allotted to the SPD, three to the CDU and one each to the FWG and the FDP.

Mayors
Thomas Eckhardt (SPD) was elected mayor in 2014, and re-elected in 2020. Previous mayors were:
2002–2014: Karl-Heinz Schäfer (SPD)
1994–2002: Gerhard Büchling (independent)

Coat of arms
The town's arms might be described thus: Or a rose azure sepalled vert surmounted by a lion rampant barry of eight argent and gules armed of the first.

This description is based on the arms shown in this article. However, the German blazon specifies that the lion (which is the Lion of Hesse, the main charge in Hesse's state coat of arms) should be a neun Mal von Silber und Rot geteilter Löwe, or “barry of nine”, that is, with nine horizontal stripes.

Town partnerships
 Vimoutiers, Orne, France since 1971
 Tambach-Dietharz, Thuringia since 1999

Culture and sightseeing

Buildings

 Historic town core with Town Hall from 1668
 Boyneburg ruins owned by the family von Boyneburg near Wichmannshausen in the Ringgau range
 Evangelical town church from 1488

Museums
 Museum at the old Boyneburg Palace in the outlying centre of Wichmannshausen
 Kleines Bergbau-Museum (bituminous shale mining) of Sontra
 Steinmühlen-Museum in Sontra

Sport
Popular sports are practised in town by TV Sontra 1861 e.V. in several departments. Further sports can be played at the leisure and adventure pool (outdoor swimming pool) with its giant waterslide, a miniature golf course and a skittles centre.

There are two shooting clubs in town, the Schützengilde Sontra and the Sportschützenverein 1958 Sontra e. V. On the Dornberg near Sontra, the Mittelhessischer Verein für Flugsport e.V. Sontra/Bebra (aerial sports) runs the Dornberg-Sontra gliding airfield.

SG Sontra 1919 e.V. is the resident football club and currently plays in the Kreisliga A.

Economy and infrastructure

Transport
Through the town run Bundesstraßen 27 and 7. The Autobahn A 44 (Kassel–Eisenach), which will lead around the outlying centres, is either in planning or under construction.

There is a link to the A 4 (Aachen–Görlitz) at the Wommen/Sontra interchange.

A railway connection is to be had at Sontra railway station on the Bebra–Göttingen line.

State institutions
In 1962, the Husarenkaserne (“Hussars’ Barracks”) was built. Stationed here was the Panzeraufklärungsbataillon 5 (“armoured reconnaissance battalion”). The property, which once had 780 service posts, was dissolved with effect from 30 June 2008.

Education
In Sontra there are the Adam von Trott-Schule (comprehensive school), two primary schools and the Barbaraschule (school for help with learning).

Famous people

 Kurt Reuber (1906–1944) physician and Evangelical minister  in the outlying centre of Wichmannshausen from 1933 to 1938, troops doctor in WWII, from him comes the famous Stalingrad Madonna, which he completed at Christmas 1942.
 Harry Haffner (1900-1969), Nazi lawyer and last president of the Volksgerichtshof, lived there from 1946 largely undisturbed and under the false name 'Heinrich Hartmann' in Sontra.

References

Further reading
 Jürgen Raabe: Zwangsarbeit bei der Kurhessischen Kupferschieferbergbau Sontra 1940 - 1945 : Erkundungen, Studien u. Dokumente,

External links

  

Werra-Meißner-Kreis